The Soul Collector is a 1999 American made-for-television romantic fantasy-drama film directed by Michael M. Scott.

Plot
Zach (Bruce Greenwood) is a soul collector: an angel who collects souls to take up to heaven. He is sent to earth to live as a human for thirty days on a Texas cattle ranch. There, he falls in love with ranch owner Rebecca (Melissa Gilbert), a widowed single mother, and influences the lives of her son and the ranch workers.

Cast
Bruce Greenwood as Zacariah
Melissa Gilbert as Rebecca
Hilary Duff as Ellie
Ossie Davis as Mordecai
Scotty Leavenworth as Danny
Brent Anderson as Sam Scott
Buck Taylor as Charlie
Clayton Adams as Bartender

Reception
OK! summed it up: "An angel (Bruce Greenwood) chooses life on Earth as a human being, falls for a widow and is zapped by the emotions that we weepy mortals take for granted. City of Angels! we hear you cry – true, but this is better."

DVD release
Echo Bridge Home Entertainment announced The Soul Collector on DVD.

References

External links

1999 television films
1999 films
1990s romantic fantasy films
American romantic fantasy films
Films shot in Austin, Texas
Films set in Texas
CBS network films
1990s English-language films
1990s American films